Egypt competed at the 2020 Summer Paralympics in Tokyo, Japan from 25 August to 6 September. This was Egypt's thirteenth appearance at the Summer Paralympics.

Medalists

Competitors
The following is the list of number of competitors participating in the Games:

Athletics 

Source:

Badminton

Goalball 

With the withdrawal of the Algeria women's team by 21 April 2021, the International Paralympic Committee selected Egypt as a replacement.  A goalball team has up to six players, separate to team staff (of which, up to three may be on the team bench as well).

Women's

Group stage

Powerlifting

Source:

Sitting volleyball 

Egyptian men's sitting volleyball team qualified for the 2020 Summer Paralympics after winning at the 2019 ParaVolley Africa Zonal Championships.

Summary

Men's tournament 

Group play

Fifth place match

Swimming 

Three Egyptian swimmers have successfully entered the Paralympic Games slot after breaking the minimum qualification score (MQS).

Table tennis

Egypt has entered six athletes into the table tennis competition at the Games. All of them qualified from 2019 ITTF African Para Championships which was held in Alexandria, Egypt.

Taekwondo

Egypt qualified two athletes to compete at the Paralympics competition. All of them are confirmed to compete after winning the gold medal at the 2020 African Qualification Tournament in Rabat, Morocco.

See also
Egypt at the Paralympics
Egypt at the 2020 Summer Olympics

References

Nations at the 2020 Summer Paralympics
2020
2021 in Egyptian sport